is a railway station on the Kominato Line in Ichihara, Chiba, Japan, operated by the third-sector railway operator Kominato Railway.

Lines
Itabu Station is served by the Kominato Railway Kominato Line, and lies 27.5 km from the western terminus of the line at Goi Station.

Station layout
Itabu Station has a single side platform serving bidirectional traffic. The station is unstaffed, but there is a small shelter on the platform.

Platforms

Adjacent stations

History
Itabu Station opened on September 1, 1926. It has been unstaffed since 5 January 1956.

Passenger statistics
In fiscal 2010, the station was used by an average of 6 passengers daily (boarding passengers only).

Surrounding area
Adjacent to the station is what is dubbed "the largest public lavatory in the world". Designed by Japanese architect Sou Fujimoto and completed in 2012, the facility for women only consists of a single glass toilet cubicle located inside a 200 square metre enclosure.

See also
 List of railway stations in Japan

References

External links

  

Railway stations in Chiba Prefecture
Railway stations in Japan opened in 1926